The Bello orthography or Chilean orthography was a Spanish-language orthography created by the Venezuelan linguist Andrés Bello and the Colombian Juan García del Río, published in London in 1823. Part of the orthography was used officially for a time in Chile, and it influenced other Spanish-speaking countries. The aim of the orthography was a perfect correspondence between graphemes and phonemes. The reform did not succeed. Standard Spanish orthography as used for Hispanic American Spanish contains several homophones (⟨c⟩, ⟨k⟩, ⟨qu⟩; ⟨c⟩, ⟨s⟩, ⟨z⟩; ⟨g⟩, ⟨j⟩, ⟨x⟩; ⟨b⟩, ⟨v⟩; ⟨y⟩, ⟨ll⟩; ⟨i⟩, ⟨y⟩) or letters that represent more than one sound (⟨c⟩, ⟨g⟩, ⟨r⟩, ⟨x⟩, ⟨y⟩), and other variances (⟨h⟩ being generally unaspirated but pronounced in some loan words; ⟨u⟩ after ⟨g⟩ and ⟨q⟩). Bello proposed several modifications that he believed should be undertaken in two stages:

First stage:
 Substitute ⟨j⟩ for "weak" ⟨g⟩ sounds;
 Substitute ⟨z⟩ for "weak" ⟨c⟩ sounds;
 Remove silent ⟨h⟩s and the silent ⟨u⟩ of ⟨qu⟩-;
 Substitute ⟨i⟩ for ⟨y⟩s used as vowels;
 Always write ⟨rr⟩ where a rolled ⟨r⟩ is pronounced.

Second stage:
Substitute ⟨q⟩ for "strong" ⟨c⟩ sounds;
Remove the silent ⟨u⟩ in ⟨gu⟩-.

On October 17, 1843, Domingo Faustino Sarmiento (the Bello rector of the University of Chile) presented a project to the Faculty of Humanities and Philosophy: Report on American Orthography.

On February 19, 1844, the Faculty judged the reform to be radical, but recommended some of Bello's ideas. The government of Chile followed this recommendation and that year introduced the following reforms:
Substituting ⟨j⟩ for "weak" ⟨g⟩ sounds
Substituting ⟨i⟩ for ⟨y⟩ used as vowels;
Writing ⟨s⟩ instead of ⟨x⟩ before consonants.

The changes influenced Argentina, Ecuador, Colombia, Nicaragua, and Venezuela. With time, however, Spanish orthography returned to how it had been previously. The last country to return to standard orthography was Chile, where President Carlos Ibáñez del Campo established the use of RAE orthography in teaching and official documents in Decree No. 3,876 of July 20, 1927, going into effect on October 12, 1927.

The poet and Nobel Prize winner Juan Ramón Jiménez and his wife Zenobia Camprubí, translator of Rabindranath Tagore, used an orthography similar to that of Bello in their work.

See also 

Spanish language in the Americas
Chilean Spanish
Venezuelan Spanish
Phonemic orthography
Real Academia Española
Spanish orthography
Spelling reform

Bibliography 

 Bello, Andrés y Juan García del Río. (1823) 1826. Indicaciones sobre la conveniencia de simplificar la ortografía en América. Biblioteca Americana (pags 50-66), Londres. Reimpreso en El Repertorio Americano (octubre de 1826, pags. 27-41) 
 Bello, Andrés.1827. Ortografía castellana, en El Repertorio Americano (abril de 1827, pags. 10-16). Londres 
 Bello, Andrés. 1844. Ortografía, en El Araucano 10 y 24 de mayo de 1844, Santiago. 
 Bello, Andrés. 1847. Gramática de la lengua castellana destinada al uso de los americanos 
 Carbonell, José Antonio. 2007. Andrés Bello en Babel, trabajo presentado en el IV Congreso Internacional de la Lengua Española 2007. Cartagena de Indias. 
 Contreras E, Lidia. 1993. Historia de las ideas ortográficas en Chile Centro de Investigaciones Barros Arana. Santiago.
 Rosenblat, Ángel. 1981. Las ideas ortográficas de Bello, en Andrés Bello, Obras completas, t. V, La Casa de Bello, Caracas, 1981, pp. IX–CXXXVIII.
 Rosenblat, Ángel. 2002. El español de América. Biblioteca Ayacucho, Caracas.

References

Spanish language
Orthography reform
Spanish dialects of South America
1823 introductions
Languages of Chile
19th century in Chile
1927 disestablishments in Chile